Mohammed Ali Salim is a Libyan politician who was the Acting Chairman of the General National Congress of Libya, a role he held as the oldest member of Libya's first democratically elected legislature until Mohamed Yousef el-Magariaf was appointed permanent chair.

References

Date of birth missing (living people)
Government ministers of Libya
Heads of state of Libya
Living people
People of the First Libyan Civil War
Year of birth missing (living people)